Azteca Theater may refer to:

Azteca Theater (Fresno, California), opened 1948, closed in the late 1980s, partially reopened in 1999 with an art gallery and events, listed on the National Register of Historic Places
Azteca Theater (Houston, Texas), opened 1955 as Houston Theatre, renamed Azteca Theater in 1955, closed 1957